Thomas-Henri Lefebvre (23 May 1927 – 20 November 1992) was a Liberal party member of the House of Commons of Canada. He was born in North Bay, Ontario and became a garage owner and operator by career.

The son of Jean-Charles Lefebvre and Clarilda Provost, he was educated in North Bay and established himself in business in Témiscamingue, Quebec. In 1951, he married Léatrice-Lucille Vaillancourt. Lefebvre served on the town council for Témiscamingue from 1961 to 1965. He was elected at Quebec's Pontiac—Témiscamingue electoral district in the 1965 federal election. He was re-elected in the 1972, 1974, 1979 and 1980 federal elections as the riding changed names to Pontiac and Pontiac—Gatineau—Labelle.

Lefebvre served six consecutive terms in the 27th through 32nd Canadian Parliaments until becoming a Senator of the De Lanaudière division in 1984. He remained a member of the Canadian Senate until his death in 1992 of cancer.

There is a Thomas Lefebvre fonds at Library and Archives Canada.

Electoral record

References

1927 births
1992 deaths
Canadian senators from Quebec
Deaths from cancer in Canada
Members of the House of Commons of Canada from Quebec
Liberal Party of Canada MPs
Liberal Party of Canada senators
People from North Bay, Ontario
Franco-Ontarian people